"La danza" (Dance) (1835) is a patter song by Gioachino Rossini, in Tarantella napoletana time, the eighth song of the collection Les soirées musicales (1830–1835). The lyrics are by Count Carlo Pepoli (it), librettist of Vincenzo Bellini's opera I puritani. "La danza" is a stand-alone chamber vocal piece, rather than part of a larger work.

Franz Liszt transcribed it for piano; Frédéric Chopin used the song as inspiration for his Tarantelle in A-flat, Op. 43; and Ottorino Respighi featured it in La Boutique fantasque. "La danza" was loosely the original source of the popular wedding tarantella "C'è la luna mezzo mare" and its English versions "Oh! Ma-Ma!" and "Lazy Mary".

Lyrics

References

External links

Compositions by Gioachino Rossini
1835 compositions
1830s songs
Patter songs
Songs about dancing